Model for Murder is a 1959 British crime film directed by Terry Bishop and starring Keith Andes, Hazel Court and Jean Aubrey.

Plot
American sailor David Martens, on shore leave in England, visits his brother Jack's grave. He meets fashion designer Sally Meadows, who by coincidence works with Jack's ex-fiancée, Diana, a model.

Successful stylist Kingsley Beauchamp and financial backer Madame Dupont own the company where Sally and Diana are employed. Expensive borrowed diamonds are to be worn by Diana when she models a new dress, but Beauchamp hires two men, Costard and Podd, to break into the safe after hours and steal the gems.

Diana stumbles on the robbery, and Costard kills her with a knife and knocks David unconscious. Beauchamp decides to frame David for the theft by placing the murder weapon in his pocket and crashing a car with David inside, having reported it stolen.

While the police make David a prime suspect, Beauchamp and Costard dispose of Diana's body and the diamonds. When David starts to suspect them they decide to murder him using gas, but Sally saves him.

Diana's body is found in a river. David goes to Costard's home and discovers the missing dress worn by Diana. He knows that Beauchamp is about to fly to Amsterdam, so he hurries to the airport. Costard is there, being double-crossed while Podd smuggles the jewels on Beauchamp's behalf. The police arrive in time to arrest all three.

Cast
 Keith Andes - David Martens
 Hazel Court - Sally Meadows
 Jean Aubrey - Annabelle Meadows
 Michael Gough - Kingsley Beauchamp
 Julia Arnall - Diana Leigh
 Patricia Jessel - Madame Dupont
 Peter Hammond - George
 Edwin Richfield - Costard, Chauffeur
 Alfred Burke - Podd
 Richard Pearson - Bullock
 George Benson - Freddie
 Diane Bester - Tessa
 Howard Marion-Crawford - Inspector Duncan
 Neil Hallett - Sgt. Anderson
 Barbara Archer - Betty Costard
 Annabel Maule - Hospital Sister 
 Charles Lamb - Lock Keeper

References

External links

1959 films
Films directed by Terry Bishop
1959 crime films
British crime films
Films set in London
1950s English-language films
1950s British films